International Botanical Congress (IBC) is an international meeting of botanists in all scientific fields, authorized by the International Association of Botanical and Mycological Societies (IABMS) and held every six years, with the location rotating between different continents. The current numbering system for the congresses starts from the year 1900; the XVIII IBC was held in Melbourne, Australia, 24–30 July 2011, and the XIX IBC was held in Shenzhen, China, 23–29 July 2017.

The IBC has the power to alter the ICN (International Code of Nomenclature for algae, fungi, and plants), which was renamed from the International Code of Botanical Nomenclature (ICBN) at the XVIII IBC. Formally the power resides with the Plenary Session; in practice this approves the decisions of the Nomenclature Section. The Nomenclature Section meets before the actual Congress and deals with all proposals to modify the Code: this includes ratifying recommendations from sub-committees on conservation. To reduce the risk of a hasty decision the Nomenclature Section adopts a 60% majority requirement for any change not already recommended by a committee.

History 
Prior to the first International Botanical Congress, local congresses concerned with natural sciences generally had grown to be very large, and a more specialized but also international meeting was considered desirable. The first annual IBC was held in 1864 in Brussels, in conjunction with an international horticultural exhibit. At the second annual congress (held in Amsterdam), Karl Koch made a proposal to standardize botanical nomenclature, and the third congress (held in London) resolved that this matter would be dealt with by the next congress.

The fourth congress, which had as one of its principal purposes to establish laws of botanical nomenclature, was organized by la Société botanique de France, and took place in Paris in August 1867. The laws adopted were based on those prepared by Alphonse de Candolle. Regular international botanical and/or horticultural congresses were held but made no further changes to nomenclature until the 1892 meeting in Genoa, which made some small changes to the laws of nomenclature. Subsequent meetings are as follows in the table below. The "Code" column shows whether a code of nomenclature was adopted.

Committees

Nomenclature Committee for Fungi 
The Nomenclature Committee for Fungi (NCF) is a permanent committee of the IBC, appointed to discuss the international rules applied to fungi, especially their taxonomy. The members of the NCF are elected every six years. The internationally agreed rules that regulate how fungi are named are examined and revised at each International Botanical Congress, held every six years. As of 2021, Scott Alan Redhead chairs the committee.

Notes

References

External links

International Association of Botanical and Mycological Societies (IABMS)

Botanical societies
International scientific organizations